Only one of the five New Jersey incumbents were re-elected.

See also 
 List of United States representatives from New Jersey
 United States House of Representatives elections, 1794 and 1795

1794
New Jersey
United States House of Representatives